Santa Maria Maggiore is a church in Rome.

Santa Maria Maggiore may also refer to:

Basilica vetus, former cathedral of Santa Maria Maggiore in Milan
Santa Maria Maggiore, Piedmont, a municipality in Verbano-Cusio-Ossola, Piedmont, northern Italy
Santa Maria Maggiore, Tuscania, a basilica in Italy
Santa Maria Maggiore, Assisi, a church in the region of Umbria Italy
Barletta Cathedral, a cathedral in the region of Apulia, Italy
Santa Maria Maggiore, Bergamo, a church in Italy
Santa Maria Maggiore, Florence, a church in the region of Tuscany, Italy
Santa Maria Maggiore, Gazzo Veronese, a church in Italy near Verona
Santa Maria Maggiore, Guardiagrele, a church in the Abruzzo region of Italy
Santa Maria Maggiore, Lanciano, a church in the region of Abruzzo, Italy
Santa Maria Maggiore, Trento, a church in Italy
Santa Maria Maggiore, Vasto, a church in the region of Abruzzo, Italy